Chan Chi Ieng (born 8 June 1993) is a Macanese footballer who currently plays as a midfielder for Polícia de Segurança Pública.

Career statistics

Club

Notes

International

References

1993 births
Living people
Macau footballers
Macau international footballers
Association football midfielders